Lim Chiew Peng (–27 November 2016) was a Singaporean former national goalkeeper.

Career 
Lim had played in two Malaysia Cup finals in 1976 and 1979 and was part of the team when Singapore won the historic Malaysia Cup in 1977 after 12 years.

He retired on 12 February 1980 after being in the national squad for 10 years.

After his playing days, Lim took to goalkeeper coaching and was with five-time S.League champion Tampines Rovers FC and worked at Komoco Motors.

Death 
Lim died of cancer, aged 65, on 27 November 2016.

Honours

International 

 Malaysia Cup : 1977

References 

2016 deaths
Singaporean footballers
1950s births
Association football goalkeepers
Singapore international footballers
Singaporean sportspeople of Chinese descent